Free Spirit Media is a film and media organization based in Chicago, Illinois. With locations across the city, they focus primarily on the West and South Sides. Their mission is to provide education, access, and opportunity in media production to over 500 underserved urban youth every year.

Mission
Free Spirit Media transforms media and society by providing opportunities for emerging creators, primarily from communities of color, to produce and distribute original content and to pursue artistic, personal and professional aspirations.

Programs
Free Spirit Media currently comprises seven programs: In-School, HoopsHIGH, FSM News (South and West), The Real Chi (formerly Real Chi Youth), Industry Pathways, and Free Spirit PRO. While each program focuses on underserved and underrepresented young people in Chicago, each program teaches or develop different forms of media literacy and media creation in distinct ways.

Work

Suspension stories
Suspension stories is an initiative resulting from a collaboration between the Project NIA and the Rogers Park Young Women's Action Team  that collect stories about students involved with unfair Suspension and Expulsion primarily through videos. They have also filmed and gathered information from teachers and other school personnel.

See also
Project NIA
Rogers Park Young Women's Action Team
After School Matters

References

Mass media companies of the United States